Wake Up and Smell the... Carcass is a compilation album by the band Carcass, and is also the name of a video/DVD compilation of the band's songs. The cover is a photo of John F. Kennedy's autopsy.

Track listing

Tracks 1-5 are the band's promo videos, 6-15 were recorded live in 1992 on the "Gods of Grind" tour, and 16-22 were recorded in 1989 on the "Grindcrusher Tour".

Personnel

Carcass
 Ken Owen – drums, backing vocals (12, 14–17)
 Bill Steer – guitar, vocals (12–14, 16–17)
 Jeffrey Walker – bass guitar, vocals, compilation compiling
 Michael Amott – lead guitar (12–13)
 Carlo Regadas – lead guitar (1–9)

Technical personnel
 Colin Richardson – production (1–5, 12–14), mixing (10–11)
 Stephen Harris – engineering (1–5)
 Nick Brine – assistant engineering (1–5)
 Barney Herbert – assistant engineering (1–5)
 Jim Brumby – assistant engineering (1–5)
 Tony Wilson – production (6–9)
 Ted De Bono – engineering (6–9)
 Ken Nelson – engineering (10–11)
 Andrea Wright – assistant engineering (10–11)
 Keith Hartley – engineering (12–16)
 Ian McFarlane – assistant engineering (12–14)
 Keith Andrews – engineering (17)
 Digby Pearson – executive production
 Mitch Dickinson – compilation compiling
 Noel Summerville – mastering
 Antz White – art direction, design, digital manipulation
 Dan Tobin – sleeve notes

References

Carcass (band) compilation albums
1996 compilation albums
2001 video albums
2001 compilation albums
2001 live albums
Live video albums
Music video compilation albums
Earache Records compilation albums
Earache Records video albums
Earache Records live albums